A zip line consists of a pulley suspended on a cable, usually made of stainless steel, mounted on a slope

The term zipline may refer to:

Zipline (drone delivery company), an American company that builds and operates small drone aircraft for delivery of medical products.
Zipline Creative, a South Wales-based film, TV, and radio production company.
Zipline Safari, a zip-line course in Florida.